Professor Mamlock is an East German drama film. It was released in 1961.

Plot
Professor Mamlock, a respected Jewish surgeon, is certain that the Weimar Republic would survive the political crisis of the early 1930s. He disapproves of his son, Rolf, a communist activist who openly opposes the Nazis. When Hitler rises to power, Mamlock loses his work and his dignity. Realizing the mistake he made by being politically apathetic, Mamlock commits suicide. The film ends with his dead face blending away from the screen, on which appears the inscription: "there is no greater crime than not wanting to fight when fight one must." (Es gibt kein größeres Verbrechen, als nicht kämpfen zu wollen, wenn man kämpfen muss)

Cast
Wolfgang Heinz as Professor Mamlock
Ursula Burg as Ellen Mamlock
Hilmar Thate as Rolf Mamlock
Doris Abeßer as Ruth Mamlock
Herwart Grosse as Dr. Friedrich Carlsen
Peter Sturm as Dr. Hirsch
Harald Halgardt as Dr. Hellpach
Lissy Tempelhof as Dr. Inge Ruoff
Manfred Krug as SA man
Kurt Jung-Alsen as Schneider
Ulrich Thein as Ernst
Agnes Kraus as Nurse Hedwig
Franz Kutschera as Werner Seidel
Günter Naumann	as Kurt Walter
Günther Grabbert as Simon

Production

The film was adapted from the play Professor Mamlock, written by the director's father Friedrich Wolf during 1933, when he was in exile in France. It featured most of the cast that participated in the 1959 Kammerspiele staging of the play.

When Wolf was asked why he decided to make another film adaptation of the play - the first was done in 1938 - he answered: "our objective was not the persecution of Jews... But the destiny of a liberal intellectual, who is forsaken by his class. This individual no longer believes in the middle class, and yet he does not find his way to the working class. His only escape becomes suicide".

Reception
Professor Mamlock sold 940,000 tickets in East Germany, becoming a modest commercial success. The film won the Gold Prize in the 2nd Moscow International Film Festival on 23 July 1961. Wolf also received the Silver Lotus Award in the II International Film Festival of India, held in New Delhi in November 1961.

Daniela Berghahn considered the film as "paradigmatic" to DEFA's treatment of the persecution of Jews by the Nazis: by contrasting the apolitical, lethargic Mamlock to his son, Rolf, the passionate communist and resistance fighter, Wolf condemned the professor for failing to join the resistance and "utterly scandalously... Made him accountable for his own fate." Anthony S. Coulson analyzed the picture as a belated metamorphosis of the title character, who ceases denying reality only when all is lost: "Mamlock's transformation is presented as a renunciation of his previous self... But that insight comes too late to save him and his kind... His fate is attributed to his failure to fight... Wolf's film reaffirms the political pathos of his father's play."

References

External links
 
 Original 1961 poster on ostfilm.de.
Professor Mamlock. PROGRESS-Film Verleih.

1961 films
1961 drama films
East German films
German drama films
1960s German-language films
Films directed by Konrad Wolf
Films about Nazi Germany
Films set in 1933
Films about Jews and Judaism
Films about communism
1960s German films